Mere Haana Hall  (1881 – 23 August 1966) was a New Zealand teacher and principal. Of Māori descent, she identified with the Ngāti Rangiwewehi iwi, part of the Te Arawa confederation. She was born in Tauranga in about 1881. She attended Hukarere Native School for Girls and from 1927 to 1944 she was the principal of Hukarere.

In the 1952 New Year Honours, Hall was appointed a Member of the Order of the British Empire for services to the Māori people.

References

1880s births
1966 deaths
New Zealand educators
People from Tauranga
Ngāti Rangiwewehi people
Te Arawa people
New Zealand Māori schoolteachers
New Zealand Members of the Order of the British Empire
Date of birth missing
Place of death missing
People educated at Hukarere Girls' College